The 1990–91 NBA season was the Nuggets' 15th season in the National Basketball Association, and 24th season as a franchise. Bernie Bickerstaff took over as General Manager and decided it was time to rebuild the Nuggets. At the time, the club had the oldest team in the league. The Nuggets would make radical changes trading off stars for draft picks. The team selected LSU guard Chris Jackson with the third overall pick in the 1990 NBA draft, while acquiring Orlando Woolridge from the Los Angeles Lakers during the off-season.

Under new head coach Paul Westhead, the Nuggets got off to a bad start losing their first seven games. At midseason, the team acquired Reggie Williams from the San Antonio Spurs, and traded Walter Davis to the Portland Trail Blazers. The Nuggets won six consecutive games between January and February, but their struggles continued as they lost seven in a row afterwards. They lost ten consecutive games late in the season, and finished last place in the Midwest Division with a league worst 20–62 record.

By season's end, the Nuggets led the league in team scoring with 119.9 ppg, but also allowed 130.8 ppg, setting a new record for NBA defensive generosity. Jackson was selected to the All-Rookie Second Team. Following the season, Woolridge was traded to the Detroit Pistons, and Michael Adams was traded back to the Washington Bullets.

NBA Draft

Roster

Regular season

Season standings

y - clinched division title
x - clinched playoff spot

z - clinched division title
y - clinched division title
x - clinched playoff spot

Record vs. opponents

Game log

Player statistics

Regular season

Player Statistics Citation:

Awards and records
 Mahmoud Abdul-Rauf, NBA All-Rookie Team 2nd Team

Transactions

References

Denver Nuggets seasons
1990 in sports in Colorado
1991 in sports in Colorado
Denver Nuggets